Tringham is a surname. Notable people with the surname include:

David Tringham (born 1935), British assistant film director
Holland Tringham (1861–1908), British artist and illustrator
Ruth Tringham (born 1940), British anthropologist